Harald E. Esch (December 22, 1931 – October 7, 2017) was a German-American biologist and professor. He was a professor at the University of Notre Dame and an international authority on bee communication.

Early life and education 
Harald E. Esch was born on December 22, 1931 in Düsseldorf, Germany. His parents were Helene and Walter Esch.

He studied physics and mathematics at the University of Bonn and the Free University of Berlin. For his doctorate, he studied biology at the University of Würzburg under Karl von Frisch. In 1960, he earned a doctorate in Zoology and Mathematics for his work on insect chemosensory physiology. Esch worked as an Assistant Professor in the Radiation Research Laboratory at the Ludwig Maximilian University of Munich, before immigrating to the United States in 1964.

Career 

In 1965, Esch became a professor at the University of Notre Dame in the Department of Biology. While at Notre Dame, he taught many popular courses and conducted research.

Throughout his career, Esch had his work published in numerous scientific journals and magazines. These included Scientific American, Science, Journal of Comparative Psychology, The Journal of Experimental Biology, Journal of Comparative Physiology B, and The Science of Nature, among others.

In 1998, Esch was awarded the Father James L. Shilts/Doris and Gene Leonard Teaching Award for his teaching ability. This was the highest award at the Notre Dame College of Science.

Personal life 
Esch married Ilse T. Braun in 1955 and had two children, Jan E. Esch and Iris I. Esch-Williams.

Death 
Esch died at the age of 85 on October 7, 2017 in Farragut, Tennessee.

References

External links 
Harald E. Esch's research at ResearchGate

American biologists
German American
University of Bonn alumni
Free University of Berlin alumni
University of Würzburg alumni
University of Notre Dame faculty
Academic staff of the Ludwig Maximilian University of Munich
1931 births
2017 deaths
20th-century biologists